Killiyoor is a panchayat town in Kanniyakumari district in the Indian state of Tamil Nadu.

Demographics

 India census, Killiyoor had a population of 19,275. Males constitute 51% of the population and females 49%. Killiyoor has an average literacy rate of 75%, higher than the national average of 59.5%: male literacy is 77%, and female literacy is 72%. In Killiyoor, 11% of the population is under 6 years of age.

Politics
Killiyoor (State Assembly Constituency) is part of Kannyakumari Lok Sabha constituency.

It is part of the Kanyakumari Lok Sabha constituency.

State Assembly Representatives from Killiyoor are
.R.Ponnapa Nadar
A.Neasamony
William
N.Dennis
P.Vijayarahavan
Dr. D. Kumaradas
S.John Jacob
Rajesh Kumar

References

Cities and towns in Kanyakumari district